Spironemidae is a family of heterotrophic flagellates, in the group Hemimastigophora. They vary in size and shape from the ellipsoid Hemimastix amphikineta (14 × 7 μm) to the vermiform Spironema terricola (43 × 3 μm), and are united by the possession of two rows of cilia, called kineties.

Phylogenomic analysis shows that Hemimastigophora are a distinct and ancient lineage of eukaryotic organisms, forming a possible sister clade to the supergroup Diaphoretickes.

Taxonomy

 Order Hemimastigida Foissner, Blatterer & Foissner 1988 [Hemimastigophora Foissner, Blatterer & Foissner 1988 sensu Cavalier-Smith 1993; Hemimastigea Foissner, Blatterer & Foissner 1988; Hemimastigidea]
 Family Spironematellidae
 Genus Hemimastix Foissner, Blatterer & Foissner, 1988
 Species H. amphikineta Foissner, Blatterer & Foissner, 1988
 Species H. kukwesjijk Eglit & Simpson, 2018
 Genus Stereonema Foissner& Foissner, 1993 non Kützing 1836
 Species S. geiseri Foissner & Foissner, 1993
 Genus Spironema Klebs, 1893 non Vuillemin 1905 non Léger & Hesse 1922 non Rafinesque 1838 non Hochst. 1842 non Lindley 1840 non Meek 1864; Spironematella Silva 1970]
 Species S. multiciliatum Klebs, 1893 [Spironematella multiciliata (Klebs 1893) Silva 1970]
 Species S. terricola Foissner & Foissner, 1993 [Spironematella goodeyi (Foissner & Foissner 1993)]
 Species S. goodeyi Foissner & Foissner, 1993 [Spironematella terricola (Foissner & Foissner 1993)]
 Genus Paramastix Skuja 1948
 Species P. lata Skuja 1956
 Species P. minuta Skuja 1964
 Species P. conifera Skuja 1948
 Species P. truncata Skuja 1948

References

Thecofilosea
Cercozoa families
Hemimastigophora